Reľov is a village and municipality in Kežmarok District in the Prešov Region of north Slovakia.

History
In historical records the village was first mentioned in 1288.

Geography
The municipality lies at an altitude of 704 metres and covers an area of 14.98 km² . It has a population of about 350 people.

External links
https://web.archive.org/web/20070513023228/http://www.statistics.sk/mosmis/eng/run.html

Villages and municipalities in Kežmarok District